Saint-Michel is a municipality in the Jardins de Napierville Regional County Municipality in Quebec, Canada, situated in the Montérégie administrative region. The population as of the Canada 2021 Census was 3,521.

History
Saint-Michel was created on July 1, 1855 when the county of Huntingdon was disbanded into multiple municipalities.

Demographics

Population

Language

Education
The Riverside School Board operates anglophone public schools, including:
 John Adam Memorial School in Delson
 Saint-Lambert International High School in Saint-Lambert

See also
List of municipalities in Quebec
 Saint-Michel

References

External links

Incorporated places in Les Jardins-de-Napierville Regional County Municipality
Municipalities in Quebec
Canada geography articles needing translation from French Wikipedia